Premium Quality... Serve Loud! is the fourth studio album by the Dutch rockband Peter Pan Speedrock.

Track listing
"Donkeypunch"
"Resurrection"
"Gotta Get Some"
"Come On You"
"Auf Der Axe"
"Hellalujah!"
"Next Town"
"Sunny Side Up"
"Serve Loud"
"Motörblock"
"Bad Year For Rock & Roll"
"Rock Habit"
"Rearview Nightmare"

External links
official Peter Pan Speedrock website
 website of Peter Pan Speedrock local rockscene

Peter Pan Speedrock albums
2001 albums